Sawagongo High School is an extra county Christian boys secondary school located in Gem location, Siaya County, Kenya. The school is well known in Siaya county as a top academic performer. The school also excels in extra-curricular activities. Currently the  students population is about 1800 students.

Notable alumni
 Ambrose Adeya Adongo, former head of the Kenya National Union of Teachers
 Joe Ageyo, a television journalist at Kenya Television Network (KTN)
 Opiyo Wandayi, a member of parliament (MP)
 Edwin Abonyo, an engineer and husband of Joyce Laboso (the beloved late Bomet Governor)
 Patrick Lino Onyango, Certified Human Resources Management practitioner

References

External links 
 Sawagongo High School home page

High schools and secondary schools in Kenya
Education in Nyanza Province
Siaya County
Boys' schools in Kenya
Christian schools in Kenya